Migueláñez is a municipality located in the province of Segovia, Castile and León, Spain. According to the 2004 census (INE), the municipality had a population of around 167 inhabitants, most of which are elder people who live there year-round. During the summer time and other holidays, the population increases to nearly 200 inhabitants.

Locations
There's a large church at the center of town located in front of the plaza (which has been recently renovated). There's a single bar located along the road leading to Bernardos. There's also a large room within the bar used for miscellaneous purposes such as parties, games, etc. If you go up road beside's the bar you can find a small bullring and a playground for children. The town hall, or ayuntamiento in Spanish, is located next to the plaza in front of the fronton court.

References

Municipalities in the Province of Segovia